José María Tranquilino Francisco de Jesús Velasco Gómez Obregón, generally known as José María Velasco, (Temascalcingo, 6 July 1840Estado de México, 26 August 1912) was a 19th-century Mexican polymath, most famous as a painter who made Mexican geography a symbol of national identity through his paintings. He was both one of the most popular artists of the time and internationally renowned. He received many distinctions such as the gold medal of the Mexican National Expositions of Bellas Artes in 1874 and 1876; the gold medal of the Philadelphia International Exposition in 1876, on the centenary of U.S. independence; and the medal of the Paris Universal Exposition in 1889, on the centenary of the outbreak of the French Revolution. His painting El valle de México is considered Velasco's masterpiece, of which he created seven different renditions.  Of all the nineteenth-century painters, Velasco was the "first to be elevated in the post-Revolutionary period as an exemplar of nationalism."

Career

Velasco studied art at the Academy of San Carlos under the professor of landscape, Italian Eugenio Landesio, who began teaching at the Academy in 1855. Landesio raised landscape painting in Mexico to high art, and articulated theories of composition that he implemented in his landscapes.  Velasco is his most famous pupil, who following his mentor's departure in 1877, dominated Mexican landscape painting and gained an international reputation, whose works became part of collections in the U.S.

Velasco's production can be classified into three periods:
The academic years, from 1860 to 1889, that include La Plaza de San Jacinto en San Ángel, Las montañas de la Magadalena, La Alameda de México, El bosque de Jalapa, El Cedro de Chimalistac and El Ahuehuete de Chapultepec.

The period from 1890 to 1892, when he was in touch with French Impressionists, that includes Valle de Mexico desde el cerro de Atraeualco and Ajusco visto desde el Tepeyac.

Finally, a personal period from 1892 to 1912, Rocas del cerro de Atzacoalco, Pirámide del Sol en Teotihuacán, Popocatepetl, Ixtlaciual, Templo de San Bernardo, Cascada de Necaxa and El Puente de Metlac.

Velasco served as a Commissioner for Fine Arts for the Mexican delegation to the 1893 World's Columbian Exposition in Chicago, where he exhibited seventeen of his own oil paintings.

Velasco was interested in science, and, as a student at the Academy of San Carlos studied zoology and botany at the nearby medical school; he also studied mathematics, geology, and surveying before becoming a student of painting. In 1879, he described a new species of Ambystoma found in the Santa Isabel lake, north of Mexico City, and published his observations in the Mexican scientific journal La Naturaleza (La Naturaleza 4: 216).  The new species was named by Velasco Siredon Tigrina.  In 1888 Alfredo Dugès (1826–1910) renamed the species and dedicated it to Velasco as Ambystoma velasci (see also Plateau Tiger Salamander).

In 1997, botanists Calderón & Rzed. published Velascoa, which is a monotypic genus of flowering plants from north-eastern Mexico belonging to the family Crossosomataceae. It also was named in José María Velasco Gómez's honour.<ref>{{cite web |title=Velascoa' Calderón & Rzed.  Plants of the World Online  Kew Science |url=https://powo.science.kew.org/taxon/urn:lsid:ipni.org:names:997069-1 |website=Plants of the World Online |access-date=14 March 2021 |language=en}}</ref>

Legacy

Velasco's long career elevated Mexican landscape painting to international standing. One of his landscapes of the Valley of Mexico is in the Vatican Museum, a gift to Pope Leo XIII. His scenes of the Mexican landscape are a visual source for environmental historians, since they show the Valley of Mexico before its degradation in the twentieth century, with air pollution and urban sprawl. His landscape art has a wide appeal, since it is more accessible than history paintings that require the viewer to understand a particular event.

Today the Government of the State of Mexico, where Velasco was from, presents an award for artistic merit in his name to painters born in that state. Among the most outstanding winners are Luis Nishizawa, Leopoldo Flores, Ignacio Barrios and Héctor Cruz.

The José María Velasco Museum was opened in 1992 in Toluca with the task of preserving and promoting his paintings.

 Gallery 

Further reading
Ramírez, Fausto and Elena Altamirano Piolle, National Homage: José María Velasco, 1840–1912. 2 vols. Mexico City: MUNAL 1993.
Trabulse, Elías. José María Velasco: un paisaje de la ciencia en México''. Toluca: Instituto Mexiquense de Cultura 1992.

References

Mexican landscape painters
Mexican portrait painters
1840 births
1912 deaths
People from Temascalcingo
19th-century Mexican painters
Mexican male painters
20th-century Mexican painters
19th-century Mexican male artists
20th-century Mexican male artists